Ridge Township is a township in Carroll County, in the U.S. state of Missouri.

Ridge Township was named for the ridges within its borders.

There is a historic round barn on route 211 within the township (see List of round barns).

References

Townships in Missouri
Townships in Carroll County, Missouri